These are the team rosters of the 16 teams competing in the 2015 FIBA Asia Championship.

Group A

Head coach:  Dirk Bauermann

Head coach:  Kenji Hasegawa



Head coach:  Sat Prakash Yadav

Group B

Head coach:  Tab Baldwin
Assistant(s):  Alex Compton,  Jong Uichico,  Josh Reyes

Head coach:  Jerry Steele

Head coach:  Khaled S M H H Yousef



Group C

Head coach:  Kim Dong-kwang

Head coach:  Rajko Toroman

Head coach:  Neo Beng Siang



Group D

Head coach:  Chou Chun-san

Head coach:  Veselin Matić

Head coach:  Vassilis Fragkias

Head coach:  Vitaliy Strebkov

References 
Official website

FIBA Asia Cup squads
squads